Nemapogon interstitiella is a moth of the family Tineidae. It is found in North America, where it has been recorded from Georgia, Maine, Maryland and Tennessee.

References

Moths described in 1905
Nemapogoninae